Megachile scindularia is a species of bee in the family Megachilidae. It was described by Buysson in 1903.

References

Scindularia
Insects described in 1903